Blue Arrow Limited is a United Kingdom based employment and recruitment agency that places individual jobseekers in temporary and/or permanent catering, driving industrial and office roles across the hospitality, manufacturing, public service, retail, support services and transport sectors.

The head office is in Luton, Bedfordshire.

Blue Arrow is now part of the Impellam Group plc, an international staffing business traded on the Alternative Investment Market with operations in the UK, Ireland, Europe, United States, Australia and New Zealand.

History
On 10 November 1959, Blue Arrow (then named 'The Barnet Agency Ltd' and founded by Sheila Birch) was incorporated. On 12 October 1982, the company name was changed to 'Blue Arrow Personnel Services Ltd' and then finally to 'Blue Arrow Ltd' on 28 June 2000.

The company became listed on the Unlisted Securities Market in 1984. In June 1987, Blue Arrow acquired Manpower Inc., which was then the world's largest temporary employment agency, for $1.3bn.

In 1987, Blue Arrow was at the centre of a financial scandal when employees of National Westminster Bank's investment arm, County NatWest, covered up a failed issue of £873m of new stock (intended to finance the takeover of Manpower Inc.). Blue Arrow was cleared of any wrongdoing. In 1989, Tony Berry stepped down as CEO.

On 17 April 1996, the company was acquired by The Corporate Services Group plc. On 7 May 2008, the Corporate Services Group plc merged with Carlisle Group Limited to form one of the UK's largest recruitment groups, Impellam.

Trade memberships 
 Institute of Hospitality
 Chartered Institute of Logistics and Transport (CiLT)
 Gangmasters Licensing Authority (GLA) 
 Association of Labour Providers (ALP)
 Recruitment and Employment Confederation (REC)

See also
UK agency worker law

Footnotes

External links
Blue Arrow

Companies based in Luton
Companies formerly listed on the London Stock Exchange
Temporary employment agencies
Employment agencies of the United Kingdom
1959 establishments in England
Business services companies established in 1959